NBBJ is an American global architecture, planning and design firm with offices in Boston, Columbus, Hong Kong, London, Los Angeles, New York, Portland, Pune, San Francisco, Seattle, Shanghai, and Washington, D.C..

NBBJ provides services in architecture, interiors, planning and urban design, experience design, healthcare and workplace consulting, landscape design, and lighting design. The firm is involved in multiple markets and building types including: cultural and civic, corporate, commercial, healthcare, education, science, sports, and urban environments. The firm has been named among the most innovative architecture firms by Fast Company, the fastest growing architecture firm, and the architecture firm of choice by Wired.

The firm was an early signatory of the Architecture 2030 challenge, a global initiative stating that all new buildings and major renovations reduce their fossil-fuel GHG-emitting consumption by 50 percent by 2010, incrementally increasing the reduction for new buildings to carbon neutral by 2030. In addition, the firm is recognized as CarbonNeutral® certified by Natural Capital Partners and has signed the Amazon Climate Pledge.

History
The firm was founded in 1943 by Seattle architects Floyd Naramore, William J. Bain, Clifton Brady, and Perry Johanson, and was initially called Naramore, Bain, Brady & Johanson. The architects formed the partnership during World War II to accept large-scale federal commissions in the area, including expansion of the Bremerton Naval Shipyard, but remained together after the war. The firm remained focused on projects in the Pacific Northwest region, growing into its largest architectural firm, before accepting projects in other areas of the United States. In 1976, the firm merged with Columbus, Ohio-based Nitschke–Godwin–Bohm to form the modern "NBBJ".

Selected completed projects

Corporate/Commercial
 Amazon Spheres, Seattle, Washington (2018)
 Day 1, Seattle, Washington (2016)
 Doppler, Seattle, Washington (2015)
 Bill & Melinda Gates Foundation Headquarters, Seattle, Washington (2011)
 Russell Investments Headquarters, Seattle, Washington (2011)
 The Sail @ Marina Bay, Singapore (2008)
 Boeing Commercial Airplane Headquarters, Renton, Washington (2004)
 Reebok World Headquarters, Canton, Massachusetts (2002)
 Telenor World Headquarters, Fornebo, Oslo, Norway (2002)
 Two Union Square, Seattle, Washington (2019)
 Alipay Headquarters, China
 Samsung Headquarters, San Jose
 Tencent Headquarters, China
 Alibaba Headquarters, China
 Rainier Tower, Seattle, Washington
 Rainier Square Tower, Seattle, Washington
 The Works, Unity Campus, Cambridge, United Kingdom
 F5 Headquarters, Seattle, Washington

Healthcare
 Banner Health Banner Estrella Medical Center, Phoenix, Arizona (2004)
 Cleveland Clinic Heart Center Miller Pavilion, Cleveland Ohio (2008)
 Southcentral Foundation Primary Care Clinic, Anchorage, Alaska (2010)
 Miami Valley Hospital Heart and Orthopedic Center, Dayton, Ohio (2010)
 Massachusetts General Hospital Lunder Building, Boston, Massachusetts (2011)
 Seattle Children's Hospital Bellevue Clinic and Surgery Center, Bellevue, Washington (2011)
 Dubai Mall Medical Centre, Dubai, United Arab Emirates (2011)
 Brigham and Women's Hospital, Boston, Massachusetts
 New York University Medical Center, New York
 UCLA Medical Center, Los Angeles, California
 Jiahui Hospital, Shanghai, China
 Royal Liverpool Hospital
 University Medical Center New Orleans
 Veterans Affairs Hospital and Southeast Louisiana Veterans Health Care System Replacement Medical Center and Research Lab, New Orleans, Louisiana (2016)
 Nationwide Children's Hospital, Columbus, Ohio (2020)
 Ohana Center for Health, Monterey California
 Elks Children's Eye Clinic at Oregon Health & Science University, Casey Eye Institute, Portland Oregon
 UCSF Connie Frank Transplant Center Renovations, San Francisco, California
 Seattle Children’s Odessa Brown Children’s Clinic, Seattle, Washington (2022)
 Meridian Center for Health, Seattle, WA (2015)
 Yellowhawk Tribal Health Center, Pendleton, Oregon (2018)
 NYU Langone Health, Helen L. and Martin S. Kimmel Pavilion, New York, New York (2018)

Education
 American International University, Kuwait City, Kuwait (2019)
 City, University of London Main Entrance Transformation Project, London, United Kingdom (2016)
 Cleveland State University College of Education and Human Services, Cleveland, Ohio (2010)
 Stanford University Li Ka Shing Center for Learning and Knowledge, Palo Alto, California (2011)
 University of Oxford, Life and Mind Building, Oxford, United Kingdom 
 University of Cambridge Material Sciences and Metallurgy Building, Cambridge, United Kingdom (2012)
 University of Idaho, Integrated Research and Innovation Center, Moscow, Idaho (2016)
 University of Southampton Life Sciences Building, Southampton, United Kingdom (2012)
 Royce Institute, University of Manchester, United Kingdom (2020)

Science
 Abcam Headquarters, Cambridge, United Kingdom (2018)
 Brigham and Women’s Hale Building for Transformative Medicine, Boston, Massachusetts (2016)
 California Institute for Telecommunications and Information Technology UCSD Atkinson Hall building, San Diego, California (2005)
 Henry Royce Institute, University of Manchester, United Kingdom (2020)
 Wellcome Trust Sanger Institute, Cambridgeshire, United Kingdom (2005)
 European Bioinformatics Institute, Cambridgeshire, United Kingdom (2007)
 Seattle Children's Research Institute, Seattle, Washington (2009)
 Nationwide Children's Hospital Research Institute, Columbus, Ohio (2012)
 University Enterprise Zone at Queen Mary University, London, United Kingdom (2021)
 Quadram Institute, Norwich, United Kingdom (2018)

Cultural and Civic
 Federal Reserve Bank Building, Seattle, Washington (1951)
 Seattle Justice Center, Washington (2002)
 United States Courthouse, Seattle, Washington (2003)
 United States Courthouse, Bakersfield, California (2012)
 United States Courthouse, Billings, Montana (2012)
 Denny Substation, Seattle
 Columbus Metropolitan Library branches (Driving Park, Dublin, and Northside)
 Seattle Opera at the Center, Seattle, Washington (2018)

Sports/Expo
 Kingdome, Seattle, Washington (1976)
 KeyArena, Seattle, Washington (1995)
 T-Mobile Park, Seattle, Washington, 1999
 Staples Center, Los Angeles, California (1999)
 Paul Brown Stadium (now Paycor Stadium since 2022), Cincinnati, Ohio (2002)
 Lincoln Financial Field, Philadelphia, Pennsylvania (2003)
 AsiaWorld-Expo, Lantau, Hong Kong (2005)
 UCLA Pauley Pavilion Renovation, Los Angeles, California (2012)
 Hangzhou Sports Park Stadium, Hangzhou, China (2017)
 Central Bank Center Renovation (Rupp Arena), Lexington, Kentucky (2022)

Urban Environments
 Shanghai Bund Renovation, Shanghai, China (2011)
 Dallas Arts District
 Pittsburgh Waterfront Master Plan
 Tencent Shenzhen Headquarters Project, Shenzhen, China
 Louisiana State University Comprehensive and Strategic Master Plan, Baton Rouge, Louisiana (2018)
 Downtown Boston Planning Study, Boston, Massachusetts (2020)

Selected designers
Designers at NBBJ include: Steve McConnell (appointed managing partner in 2014), Jonathan Ward (partner), Joan Saba, Robert Mankin (partner), Ryan Mullenix (partner), and Tim Johnson (partner).

Recognition 
 BusinessWeek/Architectural Record Good Design is Good Business Awards, Alley24/223 Yale, 2008
 American Institute of Architects (AIA) Institute Honor Awards, Interiors, R.C. Hedreen Company, 2009
 Interior Design Magazine, Best of Year Award, Dubai Mall Medical Centre, 2010
 Puget Sound Business Journal, Corporate Champion for the Environment, 2011
 Royal Institute of British Architects, RIBA Award Winner, Life Sciences Building at the University of Southampton, 2011
 American Institute of Architects Academy of Architecture for Health, Healthcare Award, Seattle Children's Bellevue Clinic and Surgery Center, 2011
 American Institute of Architects Academy of Architecture for Health, Healthcare Award, Massachusetts General Hospital Lunder Building, 2012
 IIDA, Healthcare Interiors Award, Bayt Abdullah Children's Hospice, 2012
 Interior Design Magazine, Best of Year Award, Bill & Melinda Gates Foundation Campus, 2013
 Healthcare Design Magazine, Firm of the Year Award, 2013
 AIA, National Interior Architecture Award, Two Union Square, 2022
 Fast Company’s Innovation by Design Awards Honors Three NBBJ Projects, 2021 
 Archinect, An Architect’s Advice on Boosting Creativity in Hybrid Workplaces, 2022
 Modern Healthcare, Uplifting Behavioral Health Projects Fuel a New Model of Care, 2022
 Dezeen, A Net-Zero School for Neurodiverse Children in California, 2022
 Metropolis Magazine, St. Michael Medical Center Embraces its Northwest Setting, 2022
 New York Times, Say Goodbye to the Boring Conference Room, 2022

References

External links 

 

1943 establishments in Washington (state)
Architecture firms based in Washington (state)
Companies based in Seattle
Design companies established in 1943